Presidential elections were held in Djibouti on 8 April 2011. Incumbent president Ismail Omar Guelleh was re-elected with 81% of the vote, He defeating Mohamed Warsama Ragueh, an attorney and former judge who received 19% of the vote.

Djibouti's opposition coalitions boycotted the elections, saying they would not be free and fair, leaving only President Guelleh and Ragueh, who had served as President of Djibouti's Constitutional Council in 2005. Ragueh complained about irregularities in the voting.

Background

In April 2010, the National Assembly of Djibouti amended the Constitution  to allow Guelleh to stand for a third term. Presidents had been limited to two terms. Coinciding with the wider Arab Spring, protesters began calling for President Guelleh's ousting in February 2011. On at least two occasions the government detained opposition leaders and imprisoned many protesters.

Another potential candidate, businessman Abdourahman Boreh, who was living in self-imposed exile in London, did not participate because Guelleh was on the ballot.

Conduct
Democracy International (DI), an organization funded by USAID, had been in the country since November planning to monitor the elections, but was told to leave by the government on 21 March 2011 after officials  questioned its impartiality. The African Union and the U.S. and French embassies sent some observers to monitor the elections, as did other regional groups.

Results

Aftermath
Guelleh was sworn in for his third term on 8 May 2011.

References

Presidential elections in Djibouti
Djibouti
Presidential
Djibouti
Election and referendum articles with incomplete results